Patrice Collazo (born 27 April 1974) is a French rugby union footballer and is currently the Head coach of Top 14 side CA Brive.  He played as a prop. Collazo has Galician ancestry.

Whilst at Gloucester he started in the 2002 Zurich Championship Final (the year before winning the play-offs constituted winning the English title) in which Gloucester defeated Bristol Rugby.

References

External links
Gloucester profile

1974 births
Living people
People from La Seyne-sur-Mer
Rugby union props
Stade Toulousain players
Gloucester Rugby players
Barbarian F.C. players
France international rugby union players
Sportspeople from Var (department)
CA Bordeaux-Bègles Gironde players
Expatriate rugby union players in England
French expatriate rugby union players
French expatriate sportspeople in England
Racing 92 players
RC Toulonnais players
RC Toulonnais coaches
French rugby union coaches